Christopher Hewetson was Archdeacon of Chester from 1994 to 2002.

Born on 1 June 1937 he was educated at Shrewsbury School and Trinity College, Oxford. After an earlier career as a school teacher he was ordained  in 1970 following a period of study at Chichester Theological College. After curacies in  Leckhampton and Wokingham he was successively: vicar of  St Peter's, Didcot from 1973 to 1982; rector of All Saints, Ascot from 1982 to 1990; and priest in charge of Holy Trinity, Headington Quarry from 1990 to 1994.

Notes

1937 births
People educated at Shrewsbury School
Alumni of Trinity College, Oxford
Alumni of Chichester Theological College
Archdeacons of Chester
Living people